John G. Lopresto (born July 10, 1940) is an American politician who served in the New York State Assembly from 1971 to 1982.

References

1940 births
Living people
Republican Party members of the New York State Assembly